Charles Hanson (born May 1978) is an auctioneer, chartered surveyor and television personality.  He is best known for his appearances as an antiques expert on the television programmes Bargain Hunt, Flog It! and Antiques Road Trip.

Career

Business
After gaining his MRICS qualification, Hanson started his career in 1999 at Christie's as a valuer in the European Ceramics and Glass Department. Subsequently, he worked for antique houses in Cheshire and Staffordshire before founding Hansons Auctioneers and Valuers in Etwall, Derbyshire in August 2005. In 2016 his company opened a department specialising in coins and antiquities, named Historica.

The most expensive lot Hanson has sold was a Qianlong period Chinese porcelain vase which was used by the seller as a doorstop for 36 years, finishing at £650,000. Other significant sales include the medals of Rowland Hill, 1st Viscount Hill, a commander at the Battle of Waterloo and a brooch which had belonged to Katherine Neville, Baroness Hastings.

Hanson has also taken part in charity auctions for organisations including the Herd of Sheffield and Careline.

Television
Since 2002 Hanson has appeared on BBC television programme Bargain Hunt where he acts as an adviser to one of two teams of contestants who buy and sell antiques and attempt to gain a profit. In November 2018 he appeared as an expert on a celebrity edition of Bargain Hunt in which stars of the BBC series Casualty made up the teams and tried to raise money for Children in Need.

Hanson makes regular appearances on Flog It!. From 2010 he has also taken part in Antiques Road Trip in which he travels between antique shops in the United Kingdom and competes with a fellow antiques expert to make the most profit. In 2016 he appeared on For What It's Worth.

Music 
In 2017 Hanson, with fellow BBC Antique Experts Philip Serrell, Charlie Ross and James Braxton, recorded a rock version of the classic "Sleigh Ride" in aid of BBC Children in Need. It was produced by father and son team Grahame and Jack Corbyn and released digitally on independent record label Saga Entertainment. The single peaked at number 1 on the Amazon Rock Charts.

Personal life
Hanson was born in Holbrook, Derbyshire on 29 May 1978.

In 2010, Hanson married Rebecca Ludlam. In August 2012, Hanson was diagnosed with testicular cancer. Hanson raised £39,000 for the Stillbirth and Neonatal Death Society (now known as Sands by completing the Great North Run in September 2013.

Hanson lives in Derbyshire with his wife and two children.

See also
Bargain Hunt

References

English auctioneers
Living people
People from Holbrook, Derbyshire
1978 births
British television personalities